The following elections occurred in the year 2016.

Africa

Benin Republic
2016 Beninese presidential election 6 March 2016

Cape Verde 
 2016 Cape Verdean presidential election 2 October 2016

Chad 
 2016 Chadian presidential election 10 April 2016

Djibouti 
 2016 Djiboutian presidential election 8 April 2016

Equatorial Guinea 
 2016 Equatorial Guinean presidential election 24 April 2016

The Gambia 
2016 Gambian presidential election 1 December 2016

Gabon 
2016 Gabonese presidential election 27 August 2016

Ghana
2016 Ghanaian general election 7 December 2016

Morocco
2016 Moroccan general election 7 October 2016

Niger 
 2016 Nigerien general election 21 February and 20 March 2016

Nigeria 
 2016 Edo State gubernatorial election 28 September 2016
 Gubernatorial elections for Ondo State, Bayelsa State, Kogi State

Republic of Congo 
 2016 Republic of the Congo presidential election 20 March 2016

São Tomé and Príncipe 
 2016 São Tomé and Príncipe presidential election 17 July and 7 August 2016

Senegal 
 2016 Senegalese constitutional referendum 20 March 2016

Seychelles
2016 Seychellois parliamentary election 8–10 September 2016

South Africa
2016 South African municipal election 3 August 2016

Somalia 
2016 Somali parliamentary election 23 October and 10 November 2016
2016 Somali presidential election 8 February 2016

The Gambia 
 2016 Gambian presidential election 1 December 2016

Uganda 
 2016 Ugandan general election 18 February 2016

Zambia 
 2016 Zambian general election 11 August 2016
 2016 Zambian constitutional referendum 11 August 2016

Asia

Japan
 2016 Japanese House of Councillors election 10 July 2016

Hong Kong
 2016 Hong Kong legislative election 4 September 2016

India
 2016 Assam Legislative Assembly election 4 and 11 April 2016
 2016 West Bengal Legislative Assembly election 4 and 11 April 2016
 2016 Kerala Legislative Assembly election 16 May 2016
 2016 Puducherry Legislative Assembly election 16 May 2016
 2016 Tamil Nadu Legislative Assembly election 16 May 2016

Iran
 2016 Iranian legislative election 26 February 2016

Kazakhstan
 2016 Kazakhstani legislative election 20 March 2016

Kuwait
 2016 Kuwaiti general election 26 November 2016

Mongolia
 2016 Mongolian legislative election 29 June 2016

Philippines
 2016 Philippine general election (May 9, 2016)
 2016 Philippine presidential election
 2016 Philippine Senate election
 2016 Philippine House of Representatives elections
 2016 Autonomous Region in Muslim Mindanao general election
 2016 Philippine gubernatorial elections
 2016 Philippine barangay and Sangguniang Kabataan elections (October 2016)

South Korea
 2016 South Korean legislative election 13 April 2016

Syria
 Syrian legislative election, 2016

Republic of China (Taiwan)
 2016 Republic of China legislative election 16 January 2016
 2016 Republic of China presidential election 16 January 2016

Vietnam
 2016 Vietnamese legislative election 22 May 2016

Uzbekistan
  2016 Uzbekistani presidential election 4 December 2016

Europe

Austria
2016 Austrian presidential election 24 April and 22 May 2016

Bulgaria
2016 Bulgarian presidential election 6 and 13 November 2016

Czech Republic
2016 Czech Senate election 7-8 and 14–15 October 2016
2016 Czech regional elections 7–8 October 2016

Croatia
 2016 Croatian parliamentary election 11 September 2016

Georgia
 2016 Georgian parliamentary election 8 October 2016

Germany
 2016 Baden-Württemberg state election 13 March 2016
 2016 Rhineland-Palatinate state election 13 March 2016
 2016 Saxony-Anhalt state election 13 March 2016
 2016 Mecklenburg-Vorpommern state election 4 September 2016
 2016 Berlin state election 18 September 2016

Hungary 
 2016 Hungarian migrant quota referendum 2 October 2016

Iceland
2016 Icelandic presidential election 25 June 2016
2016 Icelandic parliamentary election 29 October 2016

Ireland
 2016 Irish general election 26 February 2016

Isle of Man
 2016 Manx general election 22 September 2016

Italy
 2016 Italian constitutional referendum 4 December 2016

Lithuania
 2016 Lithuanian parliamentary election 9 and 23 October 2016

Macedonia
 2016 Macedonian parliamentary election 11 December 2016

Moldova
 2016 Moldovan presidential election 30 October 2016

Montenegro
 2016 Montenegrin parliamentary election 16 October 2016

Portugal
 2016 Portuguese presidential election 24 January 2016
 2016 Azores regional election 16 October 2016

Romania
 2016 Romanian local election 5 June 2016
 2016 Romanian legislative election 11 December 2016

Russia
 2016 Russian legislative election 18 September 2016

Serbia
 2016 Serbian parliamentary election 24 April 2016

Slovakia
 2016 Slovak parliamentary election 5 March 2016

Spain
2016 Spanish general election 26 June 2016
2016 Basque parliamentary election 25 September 2016
2016 Galician parliamentary election 25 September 2016

United Kingdom
 2016 National Assembly for Wales election 5 May 2016
 2016 United Kingdom local elections 5 May 2016
 2016 London mayoral election 5 May 2016
 2016 London Assembly election 5 May 2016
 2016 Bristol mayoral election 5 May 2016
 2016 England and Wales police and crime commissioner elections 5 May 2016
 2016 Scottish Parliament election 5 May 2016
 2016 Northern Ireland Assembly election 5 May 2016
 2016 United Kingdom European Union membership referendum 23 June 2016

North America

Canada
 2016 Manitoba general election 19 April 2016
 2016 Saskatchewan general election 4 April 2016

Dominican Republic
 2016 Dominican Republic general election 15 May 2016

Haiti
February 2016 Haitian presidential election 14 February 2016
November 2016 Haitian presidential election 20 November 2016

Nicaragua
 2016 Nicaraguan general election 6 November 2016

United States
 2016 United States elections:
 2016 United States presidential election 8 November 2016
 2016 United States Senate elections 8 November 2016
 2016 United States House of Representatives elections 8 November 2016 
 2016 United States gubernatorial elections 8 November 2016

South America

Brazil
2016 Brazilian municipal elections 2 and 30 October 2016

Chile
 2016 Chilean municipal election

Peru
 2016 Peruvian general election 10 April 2016

Oceania

Australia
 2016 Australian Capital Territory general election 15 October 2016
 2016 Australian federal election 2 July 2016
 2016 Northern Territory general election 27 August 2016

Kiribati 
 2016 Kiribati presidential election 9 March 2016

Nauru
 2016 Nauruan parliamentary election 9 July 2016

New Zealand
 2016 New Zealand local elections 8 October 2016

Samoa
 2016 Samoan general election 4 March 2016

Vanuatu
 2016 Vanuatuan general election 22 January 2016

See also
 Local electoral calendar 2016
 National electoral calendar 2016
 Supranational electoral calendar 2016

References

 
2016
Elections